Cooper's Hill or Cooper Hill may refer to:
 Cooper's Hill, Bedfordshire, UK, a site of Special Scientific Interest
 Cooper's Hill, Brockworth, Gloucestershire, UK
Cooper's Hill Cheese-Rolling and Wake an annual event in Brockworth
 Cooper's Hill, near Englefield Green, Surrey, UK
 Cooper's Hill (football ground), a former football ground in West Bromwich, once occupied by West Bromwich Albion F.C.
 Royal Indian Engineering College, known colloquially as Cooper's Hill
 Cooper's Hill, a 1642 poem by John Denham
 Cooper Hill, Missouri, a community in the United States